Anubavi Raja Anubavi is a 1967 Indian Tamil-language comedy film written and directed by K. Balachander. The film stars Nagesh along with R. Muthuraman, Rajasree and Jayabharathi. It was released on July 1967. The film remade in Hindi as Do Phool (1973), in Malayalam as Aanandham Paramaanandham (1977), in Kannada as Kittu Puttu (1977) and in Marathi as Changu Mangu (1990).

Plot 

A man experiences culture shock after arriving in Madras for the first time.

Cast 
 Nagesh as Thangamuthu and Manikkam
 R. Muthuraman as Janakiraman
 Rajasree as Rajamani
 Jayabharathi as Ramamani
 Manorama as Muthamma
 Major Sundarrajan as Chidambaram
Typist Gopu as the bandit leader
O. A. K. Thevar as Public Prosecutor
 Hari Krishnan as Varadharajan
T. P. Muthulakshmi as Maragadham
S. N. Lakshmi as Manikkam mother
S. N. Parvathy as Savior of thangamuthu
Samikannu as Varadharajan's assistant

Production 
Anubavi Raja Anubavi was directed by K. Balachander, who wrote the screenplay based on a story by Rama Arangannal. The film was produced by V. R. Annamalai and M. R. M. Arunachalam under Ayya Films. Cinematography was handled by Nemai Ghosh, and editing by N. R. Kittu. The song "Madras Nalla Madras", picturised on Nagesh, was filmed on the roads of Madras (now Chennai).

Soundtrack 
Music was composed by M. S. Viswanathan, while the lyrics were written by Kannadasan. "Madras Nalla Madras" was one of the first songs that tried to provide a commentary on life in the city. References to how no one goes slow on the road or speaks good Tamil are made in the song. Like most songs in Balachander's films, the lyrics were satirical in nature. "Muthukulikka Vaareergala" was sung in the Thoothukudi dialect.

Tamil track list

Telugu track list

The Telugu language lyrics were written by Anisetty Subbarao.

Reception 
The Indian Express wrote, "The whole narration, a complete botch, is further burdened by unconvincing romantic complications. Besides under the curiously limp and unvaried direction of Balachander, the notable cast gives a somewhat dispirited performance." Kalki lauded Nagesh's performance but criticised the songs, calling the film a laugh riot worth watching. The film was a box office hit.

References

External links 
 

1960s Tamil-language films
1967 comedy films
1967 films
Films directed by K. Balachander
Films scored by M. S. Viswanathan
Films with screenplays by K. Balachander
Indian comedy films
Tamil films remade in other languages
Twins in Indian films